Chandra Theertham is the temple tank of Karaikal Ammayar Temple, Nithyakalyana Perumal Temple and the Karaikal Kailasanathar Temple. The Karaikal float festival (Theppam) celebrated in this temple tank.

History and beliefs
The belief of the Karaikal people is if we bath once in this temple tank, all the bone related diseases and fractures will get cured. The Chandra Theertham is cleaned for long time and the work got completed in the year 2010.

Karaikal Floating Festival

In 2010 the Karaikal Floating festival was held after 30 years. This was due to the help of the local MLA and former Health minister Mr. A.M.H.Nazeem. It was celebrated in a grand manner. After that continuously, for every year a Float festival was held. The Theppam will move in this Temple tank, rounding three times. People of Karaikal and nearby towns gather in the Chandra Theertham during this festival. This Floating festival is celebrated either for the Nithyakalyana Perumal or Karaikal Kailasanathar.

References

Temple tanks in India
Karaikal